Kelsey Bench-Lake County AVA is an American Viticultural Area located in Lake County, California.  The area is home to some 900 acres (364 hectares) of vines in 27 vineyards, and was officially established as an AVA by the Alcohol and Tobacco Tax and Trade Bureau (TTB) in October 2013. Sauvignon Blanc, Chardonnay, Viognier and Riesling are the principal white grape varieties within Kelsey Bench and its neighbor the Big Valley District AVA. The Zinfandel, Merlot and Cabernet Franc varieties make up the majority of red grape plantings in the area.

The name “Kelsey Bench” is a combination of “Kelsey,” the surname of several early settlers in the area, and “bench,” a term used to describe the terraces that rise above the lower elevations of the valley to the north.  The AVA boundaries cover a series of tectonically-uplifted terraces in the southern half of a valley on the banks of Clear Lake. The Mayacamas mountains in the south and west separate the area from the southern end of  Mendocino County, and the dormant Mount Konocti volcano lies to the east. The Red Hills Lake County AVA is on the south-eastern border of Kelsey Bench and when the appellation was formalized, the Red Hills boundaries were modified slightly to meet the Kelsey Bench boundaries.

Kelsey Bench shares both the valley and the TTB's AVA ruling with the Big Valley District AVA to the north.  The region's growers submitted the two petitions together, drawing a line between the valley floor and the higher elevations in the south. The higher elevations of Kelsey Bench mean that the climate here is warmer than in Big Valley District, although not so warm as Red Hills Lake County in the east. Cold air from the mountains drains off the benches into the valley below, extending the growing season by lessening the risk of frost in the early spring and fall. Vines are stressed by the strong winds that buffet the area, and photosynthesis, therefore ripening, is slowed as a result. This gives the grapes ample time to develop rich fruit complexity alongside vital acidity, leading to well-balanced wines. Kelsey Bench has predominantly rich, red, volcanic soils.   Rosa d'Oro is the only winery located within the boundaries of the AVA.

References

External links
 Rosa d'Oro Vineyards

American Viticultural Areas
American Viticultural Areas of California
Geography of Lake County, California
1991 establishments in California